There are multiple people named William Torrey:
Joseph William Torrey (1828–1885), American merchant
William Torrey Harris (1835–1909), American educator
William Torrey (fl. 1921) from Manchester Township, New Jersey
Bill Torrey (1934–2018), Canadian ice hockey executive